Asaph ( ’Āsāp̄, "Gather") is the name of three men from the Hebrew bible.  The articles related to the son of Berachiah and descendant of Kohath refer to the same person.

 Asaph, the father of Joah
 Asaph, son of Berachiah the Gershonite
Together with Heman, the grandson of the Israelite prophet Samuel (or 1 Chronicles 6:39 in non-Hebrew translations), he and his male descendants were set aside by King David to worship God in song and music. He authored Psalm 50, and Psalms 73 to 83.

 Asaph, a Levite descendant of Kohath
 Asaph, the keeper of the king's forest under the Persian king Artaxerxes I Longimanus

See also
Psalms of Asaph
Psalms

References

Set index articles on Hebrew Bible people